Ghanacarus is a genus of mites in the family Acaridae.

Species
 Ghanacarus endroedii Mahunka, 1973

References

Acaridae